Claude Dallaire (born 29 May 1960) is a Canadian weightlifter. He competed in the men's lightweight event at the 1984 Summer Olympics.

References

1960 births
Living people
Canadian male weightlifters
Olympic weightlifters of Canada
Weightlifters at the 1984 Summer Olympics
People from Montmagny, Quebec
Pan American Games medalists in weightlifting
Pan American Games bronze medalists for Canada
Weightlifters at the 1983 Pan American Games
20th-century Canadian people
21st-century Canadian people